Martinus Wiendelt Visser (28 December 1924 – 10 August 2008) was an Australian sailor who competed in the 1964 Summer Olympics.

References

1924 births
2008 deaths
Australian male sailors (sport)
Olympic sailors of Australia
Sailors at the 1964 Summer Olympics – Star